Shadrinsky Uyezd (Шадринский уезд) was one of the subdivisions of the Perm Governorate of the Russian Empire. It was situated in the southeastern part of the governorate. Its administrative centre was Shadrinsk.

Demographics
At the time of the Russian Empire Census of 1897, Shadrinsky Uyezd had a population of 310,669. Of these, 89.0% spoke Russian, 5.8% Tatar, 4.9% Bashkir and 0.2% Permyak as their native language.

References

 
Uezds of Perm Governorate
History of Kurgan Oblast